The HP Slate 21 is a computer developed by Hewlett-Packard that runs the Android operating system. It was announced on June 24, 2013, via HP's blog The Next Bench with a price of $, and released in September that year. It is described as either an all-in-one desktop computer or a large tablet computer.

The device uses a 21.5-inch touchscreen and a Tegra 4 processor, but does not include a battery. It runs Android Jelly Bean as its operating system. It received mixed reviews from critics, with reviewers favoring the screen's wide viewing angles and Full HD resolution, while criticizing the lack of software optimization for the large display.

Features

Hardware and design 
The Slate 21 uses an Nvidia Tegra 4 system-on-chip running at 1.66 GHz. It includes 1 GB of DDR3 memory and 8 GB of internal flash storage, which can be expanded via an SD card slot. Connectivity support includes three USB 2.0 ports, a 10/100Mbit/s Ethernet socket, a 3.5 mm headphone jack, Bluetooth 3.0, and dual-band 802.11 n Wi-Fi.

The Slate 21 uses a 21.5-inch IPS panel with a resolution of 1920×1080. The device includes a 2.1 megapixel front-facing camera capable of recording 720p video. It does not include an accelerometer, which meant that any Android games which use accelerometer controls cannot be played. The screen has a glossy surface. It is an optical touchscreen supporting two-point multi-touch via three cameras, unlike other tablets which use a capacitive touchscreen. The device uses a white plastic chassis, with an easel-like stand on the rear which allows adjusting the angle of its tilt between 15 and 70 degrees. The device can be fixed to a wall using a VESA mount if the hinge is unscrewed.

A USB keyboard and mouse is bundled with the device. The keyboard includes shortcut keys for access to Android menus such as the home screen and music controls, replacing the usual function keys and Start/Escape keys. It does not contain an internal battery, requiring users to turn off the device when moving it between power sockets.

Software 
The Slate 21 runs Android 4.2.2 Jelly Bean. Software bundled with the device include Google Chrome, HP's own media playback app, and the mobile version of Kingsoft Office.

Reception 
Cherlynn Low of Tom's Guide gave a mixed review, saying that the Slate 21 was an inexpensive all-in-one for users who do not require a powerful computer. She appreciated the "family-friendly" price and the screen's quality. However, she criticized the device for its low internal storage and software limitations, including its inability to run two apps on the screen at once and lack of parental controls. Sascha Segan and Joel Santo Domingo of PC Magazine gave a score of 1 out of 5, saying that "using the Slate 21 is a painful experience" which is only suitable for few tasks. They noted that the touch sensor for the screen was laggy. They also pointing out that the web browser defaulted to mobile versions of websites where text was too large, and that 8 GB of storage and 1 GB of memory was insufficient.

Dave Oliver of Wired UK gave a score of 7/10, concluding that while the Slate 21 could be "the logical next step" in theory, the lack of apps optimized for the large screen meant that the device was "not quite ready" to replace Windows computers. In a positive review, Alun Taylor of The Register described the device as "a rather good notion realised equally well". He praised the screen and speakers and recommended the device for "domestic web browsing, light computing duties, social networking and media consumption".

Variants

HP Slate 21 Pro 
The HP Slate 21 Pro was announced during CES 2014. It includes 16 GB of onboard storage and 2 GB of RAM, twice that of the Slate 21. Because it includes an HDMI input and an upstream USB port, it can be used as a touchscreen display when plugged into a conventional Windows computer. The device is preinstalled with Citrix Receiver.

Michael Brown of PCWorld rated the Slate 21 Pro four out of five stars, saying that while it was designed for business users, it was a "far better value" than the Slate 21 for consumer usage, with features that are not included in the older model.

References 

Slate 21
Android (operating system) devices
Tablet computers introduced in 2013
Hewlett-Packard All-in-one computers